Šenov u Nového Jičína is a municipality and village in the Nový Jičín District in the Moravian-Silesian Region of the Czech Republic. It has about 2,100 inhabitants.

History
The first written mention of Šenov is from 1383.

From 1949 to 1993 it was an administrative a part of Nový Jičín.

Economy
Varroc Lighting Systems, a manufacturer of lighting systems for automotive industry, has its headquarters and a production plant in the municipality.

Notable people
Franz Barwig (1868–1931), Austrian artist

References

External links

Villages in Nový Jičín District